Brandix Apparel Limited is an apparel manufacturer headquartered in Sri Lanka. It is considered to be the leading apparel manufacturing firm in the country. The company has branches in the United States of America, United Kingdom, Australia, Singapore, Hong Kong, India, Bangladesh, Cambodia, Mauritius, and the Cayman Islands. Brandix has a crucial role in the Sri Lankan economy by being the main contributor to the Gross Domestic Production. It is the single largest employer in Sri Lanka's export sector and the highest foreign exchange earning company.

History 
Brandix was founded in Sri Lanka in 1969 with the assistance of Martin Trust, an American who is regarded as the father of the modern apparel industry in Sri Lanka. The company began operations in 1972 as a conglomerate which was formally a part of Omar Group.

The business was incorporated as a private limited company in 2002 under the Companies Act No 7 of 2007 as Brandix Pvt Ltd. In 2008, the firm opened a branch in Seeduwa and the branch of the Brandix firm secured the world's first LEED (Leadership in Energy and Environmental Design) platinum certification. The company is headquartered in Colombo and has domestic branches in Seeduwa, Mirigama, Batticaloa and Pannala

In 2009, the company was recognised by the Ceylon Chamber of Commerce as one of the top 10 best corporate companies in the country. Brandix also became the first apparel firm in the world to obtain the ISO ISO 50001 standard system certification scheme in 2011.

The company has also shown significant interest towards sustainability and the company has also aimed to reach 100 percent carbon neutrality by 2023 as a part of sustainable development programme.

In June 2019, the Batticaloa branch became the first factory in the world to achieve Net Zero Carbon status.

Brandix Lanka Group received the Exporter of the Year Award at the 2018/19 National Export Awards from the Export Development Board. Ashroff Omar is the company's CEO.

References 

Clothing manufacturers
Clothing companies established in 1972
Clothing companies of Sri Lanka
Clothing brands of Sri Lanka
Manufacturing companies based in Colombo